Vishnu Bharati was a medieval vaishnavite writer from Kamrup region, Assam. His most notable work is "Dhruva Charit, which details life and character of Dhruva".

See also
 Bhattadeva
 Sridhara Kandali

References

Year of birth missing
Year of death missing
Kamrupi literary figures